Tozé may refer to:
António José Alves Ribeiro, Portuguese football forward
António José Pinheiro Carvalho, Portuguese football midfielder
Tozé Marreco, Portuguese football striker